Anne Ross is a German singer.

Anne or Ann Ross may also refer to:
Ann B. Ross, American novelist
Anne Davidson (1937–2008), née Ross, Scottish sculptor

See also
Annie Ross (1930–2020), British-American singer and actress
Annie Ros (1926–2013), Dutch gymnast